These are the official results of the Women's 400 metres event at the 1991 IAAF World Championships in Tokyo, Japan. There were a total of 37 participating athletes, with five qualifying heats and the final held on Tuesday 27 August 1991.

Medalists

Schedule
All times are Japan Standard Time (UTC+9)

Final

Semifinals
Held on Monday 1991-08-26

Quarterfinals
Held on Sunday 1991-08-25

Qualifying heats
Held on Saturday 1991-08-24

See also
 1987 Women's World Championships 400 metres (Rome)
 1988 Women's Olympic 400 metres (Seoul)
 1990 Women's European Championships 400 metres (Split)
 1992 Women's Olympic 400 metres (Barcelona)
 1993 Women's World Championships 400 metres (Stuttgart)

References
 Results

 
400 metres at the World Athletics Championships
1991 in women's athletics